Michel Sitjar (13 September 1942 – 10 June 2019) was an international rugby union player for France and played club rugby for Agen. He also tried rugby league for a year in XIII Catalan after brutally stopping his career at 28. Sitjar played as a flanker and won three Brennus Shields with the Sporting Union Agenais (1962, 1965 and 1966). 

In 2008 he published his first collection of poems (Rugby & Poésie), followed by the second one Rugby & Poésie, deuxième mi-temps two years later. 

He killed himself at his home in Lamagistère on June 10, 2019.

Sources

1942 births
2019 suicides
French rugby union players
Rugby union flankers
France international rugby union players
SU Agen Lot-et-Garonne players
French rugby league players
XIII Catalan players
21st-century French poets
Suicides by firearm in France